Sven Meinhardt (born 28 September 1971 in Mülheim an der Ruhr, Nordrhein-Westfalen) is a former field hockey forward from Germany, who won the gold medal with the Men's National Team at the 1992 Summer Olympics in Barcelona, Spain. A player from HTC Uhlenhorst in Mülheim an der Ruhr, he was also on the side that competed at the 1996 Summer Olympics in Atlanta, United States.

References
 databaseOlympics
 sports-reference

External links
 

1971 births
Living people
Sportspeople from Mülheim
Field hockey players at the 1992 Summer Olympics
Field hockey players at the 1996 Summer Olympics
German male field hockey players
Olympic field hockey players of Germany
Olympic gold medalists for Germany
Place of birth missing (living people)
Olympic medalists in field hockey
People educated at Bedford School
Medalists at the 1992 Summer Olympics
20th-century German people